Andreja Stojanović (born 12 November 1998) is a Serbian football forward who plays for Kolubara.

References

External links
 

1998 births
Living people
Footballers from Belgrade
Association football midfielders
Serbian footballers
FK Zemun players
FK Jedinstvo Ub players
FK Kolubara players
Serbian First League players